A temazcal  is a type of sweat lodge, which originated with pre-Hispanic indigenous peoples in Mesoamerica.

Overview

In ancient Mesoamerica it was used as part of a curative ceremony thought to purify the body after exertion such as after a battle or a ceremonial ball game. It was also used for healing the sick, improving health, and for women to give birth. It continues to be used today in Indigenous cultures of Mexico and Central America that were part of the ancient Mesoamerican region for spiritual healing and health enrichment reasons.

The temazcal is usually a permanent structure, unlike sweat lodges of other regions. It has various construction styles differing by region; from volcanic rock and cement adobe mud bricks even wood mud and cloth can be utilized. It may be a circular dome made to represent the uterus, although rectangular ones have been found at certain archeological sites and this shape is also used. To produce steam, water is poured over heated volcanic stones, which will not crack and explode like other rocks in confined high temperature areas. The stones may be heated with fire from an outside port or placed in a pit located in the center or near a wall of the temazcal.

See also
 Sauna

Notes

External links 

 Article on Temazcal (in English)
 Article on Oaxacan Temazcal

Aztec society
Bathing
Indigenous architecture
Ritual purification
Sauna
Mexican culture